The 2021–22 UMBC Retrievers men's basketball team represented the University of Maryland, Baltimore County in the 2021–22 NCAA Division I men's basketball season. The Retrievers, led by first-year head coach Jim Ferry, played their home games at the Chesapeake Employers Insurance Arena in Catonsville, Maryland as members of the America East Conference. They finished the season 18-14, 11-7 in America East Play to finish in 2nd place. They defeated UMass Lowell and Hartford to advance to the championship game of the America East tournament where they lost to Vermont. They received an invitation to The Basketball Classic where they withdrew due to UMBC having health concerns.

Previous season
In a season limited due to the ongoing COVID-19 pandemic, the Retrievers finished the 2020–21 season 14–6, 10–4 in America East play to finish in a tie for first place. They lost to UMass Lowell in the semifinals of the America East tournament.

Following the season, head coach Ryan Odom left the school to accept the head coaching position at Utah State. On April 12, 2021, the school named former Duquesne and Penn State head coach Jim Ferry as the team's new head coach.

Roster

Schedule and results

|-
!colspan=12 style=| Non-conference regular season

|-
!colspan=12 style=| America East Conference regular season

|-
!colspan=12 style=| America East tournament
|-

|-
!colspan=12 style=| The Basketball Classic

Source

References

UMBC Retrievers men's basketball seasons
UMBC Retrievers
UMBC Retrievers men's basketball
UMBC Retrievers men's basketball
UMBC